Jean Jimmy Alexandre ( – ), better known by his stage name Jimmy O, was a Haitian hip hop artist who was born in Port-au-Prince and lived in New York City. He was involved with Wyclef Jean's Yéle Haiti Foundation. Jimmy O performed his music in Haitian Creole.

In 2006, he and Jean held a hip-hop performance in the Bel Air suburb of Port-au-Prince that was part of the USAID-funded Clean Streets project.  The following year, he and other Haitian artists held a concert in the Champ de Mars, the largest public square in the capital, along with Wyclef Jean, Akon, and Matt Damon.

On January 12, 2010, at age 35, Jimmy O was crushed inside a vehicle he was apparently driving in downtown Port-au-Prince during the 2010 Haiti earthquake.  His mother, his wife, two of his three children, his agent, and a CNN crew were present when Jimmy O's body was discovered and identified three days later. His agent said that the loss of Jimmy O "will be tremendous in Haiti."

At the time of his death he was preparing to release his debut album Destiny in the United States.

References

1974 births
2010 deaths
American hip hop musicians
Haitian emigrants to the United States
Haitian rappers
Musicians from New York City
People from Port-au-Prince
Victims of the 2010 Haiti earthquake
Wyclef Jean